Barry Chapman Bishop (January 13, 1932 – September 24, 1994) was an American mountaineer, scientist, photographer and scholar. With teammates Jim Whittaker, Lute Jerstad, Willi Unsoeld and Tom Hornbein, he was a member of the first American team to summit Mount Everest on May 22, 1963. He worked for the National Geographic Society for most of his life, beginning as a picture editor in 1959 and serving as a photographer, writer, and scientist with the society until his retirement in 1994. He was killed in an automobile accident near Pocatello, Idaho later that year.

Early life
Barry Chapman Bishop was born on January 13, 1932, to Robert Wilson Bishop, a sociologist who was to become a dean at the University of Cincinnati, and Helen Rebecca Bishop. He was fascinated by climbing from an early age, spending his summers with the YMCA in Colorado and joining the Colorado Mountain Club at age nine or ten. Under the tutelage of the club's members, many of whom were also members of the 10th Mountain Division, Bishop quickly learned mountaineering skills and was guiding expeditions in the Rockies and Tetons by age 12.

He attended school in Cincinnati; first a private school, and a private college preparatory school beginning in 8th grade. He began his undergraduate education at Dartmouth, where he roomed with Rodger Ewy and Bill Chafee. Following an acute lung infection, Barry soon switched to the University of Cincinnati, earning a Bachelor of Science in Geology with Omicron Delta Kappa honors in 1954. While at Cincinnati, Barry was a member of Beta Theta Pi. As part of his undergraduate research, he did field work in the Mount McKinley area in the summer of 1951, during which time he participated in Bradford Washburn's expedition, reaching the summit on July 10, 1951, to claim the fourth ascent of the mountain and the first by the West Buttress route. He met Lila Mueller, also an undergraduate at the University of Cincinnati, and the two were married in 1955.

In the summer of 1952, Barry and Rodger Ewy climbed guideless on many "classics" in Europe, among which the Zugspitze Ridge, Cime Grande in the Dolomites, Z'mutt Ridge on the Matterhorn, the traverse from Gornergrat to Monte Rosa via summits of Breithorn, Castor and Pollux and both summits of Monte Rosa, and the Dent du Requin Needle on Mont Blanc. Barry soloed the Italian Ridge on the Matterhorn.

His studies continued at Northwestern University, where he earned a masters in geography in 1954–1955, studying shear moraines on the Greenland Icecap. During his work in Greenland he met Rear Admiral Richard E. Byrd, and after joining the Air Force, served as scientific advisor to Byrd's staff with Admiral Dufek, at the Antarctic Projects Office in Washington, D.C., where he monitored international scientific programs in polar research. By 1958, when he was honorably discharged from the Air Force at age 27, Bishop had accumulated considerable skills as a mountaineer, polar scientist, photographer and explorer.

His daughter Tara is now the wife of Greg Mortenson, the co-author of Three Cups of Tea.

National Geographic Society
In May, 1959, on the strength of his photographs from Antarctica and the Bugaboos, Bishop was hired by the National Geographic Society as Picture Editor for National Geographic. He rose quickly with the magazine, becoming a photographer for the magazine in 1960, and had his first published photography in 1962. His 1963 photography work on the American Everest Expedition earned him a National Press Photographers Association Special Award. Eventually he would become a vice president and Chairman of the Committee for Research and Exploration.

Himalayan expeditions
Bishop's work on shear moraines brought him to the attention of Sir Edmund Hillary, who invited him to join the 1960–1961 Himalayan Scientific and Mountaineering Expedition known as the Silver Hut expedition, where he served as the expedition's official glaciologist and climatologist. Though he was not sponsored by National Geographic on the trip, his photographic, scientific, and mountaineering accomplishments cemented his career with the Society. With fellow expedition members Mike Gill, Mike Ward and Wally Romanes, Bishop made the landmark first ascent of Ama Dablam, which was also the first winter ascent in the Himalayas.

Barry's success with the Hillary expedition and his work with National Geographic led to an invitation to join the 1963 American Everest Expedition, which aimed to make the first American ascent of Mount Everest. He was transferred to the National Geographic editorial staff and wrote an account of the expedition for the magazine, accompanied by his photography. On nearing the mountain, the expedition decided to attempt the unclimbed West Ridge, and Bishop helped establish a route up to the summit pyramid at  before transferring to the portion of the team attempting the South Col. Via that route, Jim Whittaker summitted on May 1, becoming the first American to do so. In the following weeks, Tom Hornbein and Willi Unsoeld continued the attempt on the West Ridge, and Bishop and Lute Jerstad attempted the South Col. After a stove accident early on the morning of May 22, the pair began the summit attempt, reaching the South Summit at 2:00 p.m. and the main summit at 3:30. They waited on the summit for signs of Hornbein and Unsoeld, who were also due to reach the summit that day, but short of oxygen and seeing no sign of them, they began the descent at 4:15. As darkness fell around 7:30, they made voice contact with Hornbein and Unsoeld, who had summitted and were descending the South Col. Believing the other team had failed to summit, Bishop told his partner he thought the two of them were dead and God was calling them to heaven. After rendezvousing the four decided to bivouac but having no tents could only kneel on their packs to rest. During the night, temperatures reached −18 °F, and Bishop sustained frostbite that would result in the loss of all his toes and the tip of his little finger.

On July 8, 1963, the team was awarded the Hubbard Medal by president John F. Kennedy for their achievement.

Later career
The loss of his toes marked the end of Bishop's technical climbing career, and in the late 1960s he refocused his energies on academics, enrolling in the University of Chicago's Ph.D. program in geography in 1966, assisting in high-altitude physiology studies, and planning and executing the field research for his dissertation, a cultural-ecological analysis of the Karnali Zone of western Nepal. The dissertation was eventually published in 1980 and in book form as Karnali Under Stress (1990).

Through the 1980s and early 90s, Bishop continued both his administrative duties with the National Geographic society as Vice Chairman and then Chairman of the Committee for Research and Exploration and Chief of the Geographic Liaison Office, and his research and service, leading Himalayan research expeditions in 1983 and 1985 and continuing to write for National Geographic. He retired in 1994 and moved to Bozeman, Montana.

On September 24, 1994, Bishop was on his way to deliver a lecture in San Francisco when he apparently veered onto the shoulder of the highway, lost control of his car, and was killed. He was survived by his wife Lila, who suffered minor injuries in the accident, and by his son Brent and daughter Tara. The National Geographic Society honored him posthumously with the Distinguished Geography Educator award in recognition of a life that "reflected National Geographic's mission of increasing and diffusing geographic knowledge."

See also
List of 20th-century summiters of Mount Everest

References

1932 births
1994 deaths
American mountain climbers
National Geographic people
University of Cincinnati alumni
Northwestern University alumni
Road incident deaths in Idaho
American summiters of Mount Everest